The Nepal Volleyball Association (NVA) is a national non-governmental, nonprofit sports organization in the Nepal. It represents Nepal in the Fédération Internationale de Volleyball and the Asian Volleyball Confederation, as well as the volleyball sports in the National Sports Council (Nepal).

The NVA also runs a domestic Volleyball league competition.

See also
Nepal women's national volleyball team

References

External links
Official website

National members of the Asian Volleyball Confederation
Sports governing bodies in Nepal
Volleyball in Nepal